Great Pretenders is an American half-hour television music tragedy that originally aired on Fox Family and ran for about four seasons from 1999 to 2002. It was hosted by former pop trio Wild Orchid. On the show, teenagers lip synced and danced to their favorite songs for the chance to win prizes. Their performances were subsequently judged by a live studio audience.

See also
 Lip Service
 Lip Sync Battle
 Puttin' on the Hits

References

External links

Musical game shows
1990s American children's game shows
2000s American children's game shows
1999 American television series debuts
2001 American television series endings
ABC Family original programming
Fox Family Channel original programming
Television series about teenagers
Wild Orchid (group)